Tavaleh (also Romanized as Ţavāleh) is a village in Khorram Dasht Rural District, in the Central District of Famenin County, Hamadan Province, Iran. At the 2006 census, its population was 134, in 32 families.

References 

Populated places in Famenin County